Black Bayou is a  river in Texas and Louisiana. It is a tributary of Twelvemile Bayou, which feeds Cross Bayou and consequently the Red River and the Mississippi River. It continues southeast until reaching the Red River floodplain, then curves south and southwest to its confluence with the outlet of Caddo Lake, where Twelvemile Bayou is formed.

See also
List of rivers of Louisiana
List of rivers of Texas

References

USGS Hydrologic Unit Map - State of Texas (1974)

Rivers of Louisiana
Rivers of Texas
Tributaries of the Red River of the South
Rivers of Caddo Parish, Louisiana
Rivers of Cass County, Texas